Ituaçu (alternately spelled Ituassú, Ituassu or Ituacu) is a city in the Chapada Diamantina region of Bahia, Brazil. The city is 530 km from Salvador, the capital city of Bahia. It is the birthplace of singer Morais Moreira, while another singer Gilberto Gil lived there from 2 months old. The climate is temperate, falling to 12 °C during the winter.  Its estimated population in 2020 is 19,030.

References

Municipalities in Bahia